Mattenbach is a district in the Swiss city of Winterthur. It is district number 7.

The district comprises the quarters Deutweg, Gutschick and Endliker.

References

Winterthur